The men's 50 kilometres walk competition of the athletics events at the 1979 Pan American Games took place at the Estadio Sixto Escobar.

Records
Prior to this competition, the existing world and Pan American Games records were as follows:

Results

References

Athletics at the 1979 Pan American Games